Porvoonjoki (Porvoo River) is a small river in Finland. The Mediaeval town of Porvoo is situated in the river delta. It is the main river of the Porvoonjoki drainage system, the sources of which are located on the southern slopes of Salpausselkä in Kärkölä, Hollola and Lahti. The river flows through Orimattila, Pukkila, Askola and Porvoo into the Gulf of Finland. The agricultural landscape of the Porvoo River with its ancient settlements, villages and manors together with the old town of Porvoo is part of the national landscapes of Finland.

Porvoonjoki was originally a trade route for the Tavastians and its original name may have been Kukinjoki. The name would have its roots in the Friesian nomenclature of kugg, which would correspond to other similar trading places on the coast.

See also
 Kymijoki
 Vantaanjoki

References

External links

 Porvoonjoki elävämmäksi: Porvoonjoen vesistöalue hyvään ekologiseen tilaan vuoteen 2027 – Itä-Uudenmaan ja Porvoonjoen vesien- ja ilmansuojeluyhdistys r.y. (in Finnish)

Rivers of Finland
Drainage basins of the Baltic Sea
Kärkölä
Rivers of Askola